Elections to the United States House of Representatives were held in Pennsylvania on October 11, 1796, for the 5th Congress.

Background
Thirteen Representatives (9 Democratic-Republicans and 4 Federalists) had been elected in 1794.  One Representative, Daniel Hiester (DR) of the  resigned on July 1, 1796.  His seat was vacant at the time of the 1796 election, and was filled in a special election held at the same time.

Congressional districts
Pennsylvania was divided into 12 districts, one of which (the ) was a plural district, with 2 Representatives.  These districts remained in use until redistricting after the Census of 1800.  
The  consisted of the City of Philadelphia
The  consisted of Philadelphia County
The  consisted of Chester and Delaware Counties
The  (2 seats) consisted of Montgomery, Bucks and Northampton Counties
The  consisted of Berks and Luzerne County
The  consisted of Northumberland and Dauphin Counties
The  consisted of Lancaster County
The  consisted of York County
The  consisted of Mifflin and Cumberland County
The  consisted of Bedford, Huntingdon and Franklin Counties
The  consisted of Westmoreland and Fayette Counties
The  consisted of Allegheny and Washington Counties

The counties that made up the 5th district did not border each other.  That district was therefore made up of two separate pieces rather than being a single contiguous entity

Note: Many of these counties covered much larger areas than they do today, having since been divided into numerous counties

Election results
11 incumbents (7 Democratic-Republicans and 4 Federalists) ran for re-election.  Frederick Muhlenberg (DR) of the  did not run for re-election.  Of the incumbents who ran for re-election, 9 (5 Democratic-Republicans and 4 Federalists) were re-elected.  Overall, 7 Democratic-Republicans and 6 Federalists were elected, a net gain of 2 seats for the Federalists.

Special Elections
George Ege (F) of the  resigned in October, 1797 and was replaced in a special election held October 10, 1797

With Hiester's election, the Democratic-Republicans gained 1 seat, increasing their majority to 8-5

John Swanwick (DR) of the  died on August 1, 1798 and Samuel Sitgreaves (F) of the  resigned on August 29, 1798.  Special elections were held in those districts on October 9, 1798, the same day as the elections to the 6th Congress.

Both also won election to the 6th Congress.  The 1st district changed from Democratic-Republican to Federalist while the 4th district changed from Federalist to Democratic-Republican, leaving no net change in seats for the remainder of the 5th Congress.

References
Electoral data are from the Wilkes University Election Statistics Project

1796
Pennsylvania
United States House of Representatives